Rigu or Reygu, also rendered as Rigu, may refer to:
 Rigu, Bandar Abbas, Hormozgan Province
 Rigu, Qeshm, Hormozgan Province
Rigu Bovingdon, Anglo-Maltese Australian writer and musician

See also
 Riku, Iran (disambiguation)